Baranowski (feminine: Baranowska, plural: Baranowscy) is a Polish surname. It is Lithuanised as Baranauskas and frequently transliterated from Russian as Baranovsky (feminine: Baranovskaya).  The name is also frequently found among Ashkenazi Jews.

People 
Notable people with the surname include:
Agnieszka Baranowska (1819–1890), Polish playwright and poet
Antanas Baranauskas (1835–1902), Lithuanian poet
Danny Baranowsky (born 1984), American electronic music composer
Dariusz Baranowski (born 1972), Polish cyclist
Dmytro Baranovskyy (born 1979), Ukrainian long-distance runner
Gabriel Baranovskii (1860–1920), also Gavriil (Baranovski, Baranowski) Russian architect, civil engineer, publisher and art historian
Henryk Baranowski (1943–2013), Polish theatre director and actor
Hermann Baranowski (1884–1940), German Nazi SS concentration camp commandant
Katarzyna Baranowska (born 1987), Polish Olympic swimmer
Kinga Baranowska (born 1975), Polish mountaineer
Krzysztof Baranowski (born 1938), Polish yachtsman, sailing captain, journalist and teacher
Matthias Baranowski (born 1967), German footballer
Mikhail Tugan-Baranovsky (1865–1919), Ukrainian economist
Petr Baranovsky (1892–1984) Russian architect and restorator
Stanisław Baranowski (1935-1978), Polish glaciologist
Tadeusz Baranowski (artist) (born 1954), Polish comic book artist
Tatiana Baranovskaya (born 1987), Russian acrobatic gymnast
Tekla Bądarzewska-Baranowska (1829–1861), Polish composer
Wojciech Baranowski, 17th century Archbishop of Gniezno and Primate of Poland
Zbigniew Baranowski (born 1991), Polish wrestler

See also
 
 
 Baranów Sandomierski, small town in Subcarpathian Voivodship, Poland
 Baranów Sandomierski Castle, a castle in the Mannerist style 
 Wola Baranowska, village in Poland
 Wólka Baranowska, village in Poland
 Souza-Baranowski Correctional Center, a prison in Massachusetts
 Baranauskas, Lithuanian form
 Baranoski

Polish-language surnames